Memoirs of Prison is a 1984 Brazilian drama film directed by Nelson Pereira dos Santos. It is based on Memórias do Cárcere an autobiographical novel by Graciliano Ramos, about the period he was incarcerated during the Vargas Era. The film was selected as the Brazilian entry for the Best Foreign Language Film at the 57th Academy Awards, but was not accepted as a nominee.

Cast
 Carlos Vereza as Graciliano Ramos
 Glória Pires as Heloísa (Graciliano's wife)
 Nildo Parente as Emanuel
 José Dumont as Mario Pinto
 Wilson Grey as Gaúcho
 Joffre Soares as Soares
 Fábio Barreto as Siqueira Campos
 Jorge Cherques as Dr. Goldberg
 Tonico Pereira as Desidério
 Ada Chaseliov
 Arduíno Colassanti
 Nelson Dantas as prison warden
 Silvio de Abreu
 Cássia Kis
 Marcos Palmeira
 Paulo Porto
 Ney Sant'Anna

See also
 List of submissions to the 57th Academy Awards for Best Foreign Language Film
 List of Brazilian submissions for the Academy Award for Best Foreign Language Film

References

External links
 

1984 films
1984 drama films
1980s biographical drama films
1980s Portuguese-language films
Brazilian biographical drama films
Best Picture APCA Award winners
Films based on Brazilian novels
Films based on biographies
Films directed by Nelson Pereira dos Santos
1980s prison drama films